The Mani Peninsula, also long known by its medieval name Maina or Maïna (Μαΐνη), is a geographical and cultural region in Southern Greece that is home to the Maniots (Mανιάτες, Maniátes in Greek), who claim descent from the ancient Spartans. The capital city of Mani is Areopoli. Mani is the central peninsula of the three which extend southwards from the Peloponnese in southern Greece. To the east is the Laconian Gulf, to the west the Messenian Gulf. The Mani peninsula forms a continuation of the Taygetos mountain range, the western spine of the Peloponnese.

Etymology

The name "Mani" may come from the name of the Frankish castle le Grand Magne.

Geography

The terrain is mountainous and inaccessible.

Until recent years many Mani villages could be reached only by sea. Today a narrow and winding road extends along the west coast from Kalamata to Areopoli, then south to Akrotainaro (the pointed cape, which is the southernmost point of continental Greece) before it turns north toward Gytheio. Another road, that is used by the public buses of the Piraeus - Mani line, which has existed for several decades, comes from Tripoli through Sparta, Gytheio, Areopoli and ends in the Gerolimenas port near Cape Matapan.
Mani has been traditionally divided into three regions:

Exo Mani (Έξω Μάνη) or Outer Mani to the northwest,
Kato Mani (Κάτω Μάνη) or Lower Mani to the east,
Mesa Mani (Μέσα Μάνη) or Inner Mani to the southwest.
A fourth region named Vardounia (Βαρδούνια) to the north is also sometimes included but was never historically part of Mani. Vardounia served as a buffer between the Ottoman-Turkish controlled Evrotas plains and Mani. A contingent of Muslim Albanian settlers were relocated to the region by the Ottomans. These settlers formed a large segment of the local population until the Greek War of Independence when they fled to the Turkish stronghold at Tripoli. Following the war Vardounia's Greek population was reinforced by settlers from Lower Mani and central Laconia.
Administratively, Mani is now divided between the prefectures of Laconia (Kato Mani, Mesa Mani) and Messenia (Exo Mani), in the periphery of Peloponnesos, but in ancient times it lay entirely within Laconia, the district dominated by Sparta. The Messenian Mani (also called aposkiaderi, a local expression meaning "shady") receives somewhat more rainfall than the Laconian (called prosiliaki, a local expression meaning "sunny"), and is consequently more productive in agriculture. Maniots from what is now Messenian Mani have surnames that uniformly end in -éas, whereas Maniots from what is now Laconian Mani have surnames that end in -ákos; additionally there is the -óggonas ending, a corruption of éggonos, "grandson".

History

A comprehensive history of the Mani region can be found in the article "Maniots".

A skull of Homo sapiens dating to more than 210,000 years ago was found in the Alepotrypa Cave on the western side of the peninsula.  this was the oldest evidence of Homo sapiens in Europe.

Neolithic remains have been found in many caves along the Mani coasts, including the Alepotrypa Cave. Homer refers to a number of towns in the Mani region, and some artifacts from the Mycenaean period (1900 BC - 1100 BC) have been found. The area was occupied by the Dorians in about 1200 BC, and became a dependency of Sparta. After Spartan power was destroyed in the 3rd century BC, Mani remained self-governing.

As the power of the Byzantine Empire declined, the peninsula drifted out of the Empire's control. The fortress of Maini in the south became the area's centre. Over the subsequent centuries, the peninsula was fought over by the Byzantines, the Franks, and the Saracens.

After the Fourth Crusade in 1204 AD, Italian and French knights (known collectively by the Greeks as Franks) occupied the Peloponnese and created the Principality of Achaea. They built the fortresses of Mystras, Passavas, Gustema (Beaufort), and Great Maina. The area fell under Byzantine rule after 1262, forming part of the Despotate of the Morea.

In 1460, after the fall of Constantinople, the Despotate fell to the Ottomans.  Mani was not subdued and retained its internal self-government in exchange for an annual tribute, although this was only paid once. Local chieftains or beys governed Mani on behalf of the Ottomans.

The first of these was Limberakis Gerakaris in the 17th century. A former oarsman in the Venetian fleet turned pirate, he was captured by the Ottomans and condemned to death. The Grand Vizier pardoned him, on condition that he took over control of Mani as an Ottoman agent. Gerakaris accepted, using the opportunity to carry out his feud with the strong Maniot family of the Stephanopouloi: he besieged their seat at Oitylo, captured 35 of them, and had them executed. During his twenty-year reign, he shifted allegiance between the Venetians and the Turks.

Following the failure of the Orlov Revolt, in 1776 Mani's autonomous status was recognized by the Porte, and for the next 45 years until the outbreak of the Greek War of Independence in 1821, eight rulers ("beys") reigned over the peninsula on behalf of the Porte: 
  (1776–1779)
 Michalbey Troupakis, known as Mourtzinos (1779–1782)
  or Tzanetbey (1782–1798)
 Panagiotis Koumoundouros (1798–1803)
 Antonbey Grigorakis (1803–1808)
 Konstantinos Zervakos or Zervobey (1808–1810)
 Theodorobey Tzanetakis (1811–1815)
 Petrobey Mavromichalis (1815–1821)

As Ottoman power declined, the mountains of the Mani became a stronghold of the klephts, bandits who also fought against the Ottomans. There is also evidence of a sizeable Maniot emigration to Corsica sometime during the Ottoman years. Petros Mavromichalis, the last bey of Mani, was among the leaders of the Greek War of Independence. He proclaimed the revolution at Areopoli on March 17, 1821. The Maniots contributed greatly to the struggle, but once Greek independence was won, they wanted to retain local autonomy. During the reign of Ioannis Kapodistrias, they violently resisted outside interference, to the extent of Mavromichalis killing Kapodistrias.

In 1878 the national government reduced the local autonomy of the Mani, and the area gradually became a backwater; inhabitants abandoned the land through emigration, with many going to major Greek cities, as well as to western Europe and the United States. It was not until the 1970s, when the construction of new roads supported the growth of the tourist industry, that the Mani began to regain population and become prosperous.

Economy 
Despite the region's aridity, Mani is known for its unique culinary products such as glina or syglino (pork or pork sausage smoked with aromatic herbs such as thyme, oregano, mint, etc. and stored in lard along with orange peel). Mani is also known for what some consider the world's best extra-virgin olive oil, soft-pressed from partially ripened olives of the Koroneiki variety, which are grown on mountain terraces. The local honey is also of superior quality.

Today the Mani's coastal villages are full of cafés and souvenir shops. The peninsula attracts visitors for its Byzantine churches, Frankish castles, sandy beaches and scenery. Some popular beaches during the summer are Kalogria and the beaches by Stoupa harbor, while Kardamyli and Agios Nikolaos have good pebble and sand beaches, too. The ancient tower houses of Mani (pyrgospita) are significant tourist attractions, and some offer accommodations for visitors. The Vlychada Cave at Pirgos Dirou, near Oitylo, are also a popular tourist destination.  As they are partly underwater, visitors tour them in gondola-like boats.

Gytheio, Areopoli, Kardamyli, and Stoupa are filled with tourists during the summer months, but the region is generally quiet during the winter. Many inhabitants work as olive farmers, and devote the winter months to the olive harvest and processing. Some of the villages in the mountains are less tourist oriented and often have very few inhabitants.

Religion
The introduction of Christianity came late in the Mani: the first Greek temples began to be converted into Christian churches during the 11th century A.D. A Byzantine Greek monk called Nikon "the Metanoite" was commissioned by the Church in the 10th  century (900's AD) to spread Christianity to areas such as Mani and Tsakonia, which had remained pagan.

St. Nikon was sent to the Mani in the latter half of the 10th century to preach Christianity to the Maniots. Although the Maniots began to convert to Christianity century due to Nikon's preaching, it took more than 200 years, i.e. until the 11th and 12th centuries to eliminate most of the pagan Greek religion and traditions and for the Maniots to fully accept Christianity. After his sanctification by the Greek Orthodox Church, St. Nikon became patron saint of the Mani as well as Sparta.

Patrick Leigh Fermor wrote of them:
Sealed off from outside influences by their mountains, the semi-troglodytic Maniots themselves were the last of the Greeks to be converted. They only abandoned the old religion of Greece towards the end of the ninth century. It is surprising to remember that this peninsula of rock, so near the heart of the Levant from which Christianity springs, should have been baptised three whole centuries after the arrival of St. Augustine in far-away Kent.'

Gallery

See also
Maniots
Greek War of Independence

References

Further reading
Patrick Leigh Fermor, (1958). Mani: Travels in the Southern Peloponnese. London: John Murray. Reissued in paperback 2004, .
Mickey Demos, Life in Mani Today: The Road to Freedom. 2011
Alta Ann Parkins, "Pictures of the Mani", Athens 1971.

External links

 

 

 
Peninsulas of Greece
Landforms of Peloponnese (region)
Landforms of Laconia
Landforms of Messenia
Historical regions in Greece